Hard Disk Sentinel (HDSentinel) is a computer hard disk drive-monitoring software for Windows, Linux and DOS operating systems.

History
Hard Disk Sentinel was founded and first released in 2005, developed by Heartfelt Development Services, based in Urhida, Hungary, with János Máthé as the company's CEO. The first version of Hard Disk Sentinel for Windows released on 1 November 2005.

In 2007, version 2.00 released with supporting USB drives along with free trial (unregistered) version, Hard Disk Sentinel standard (paid version with basic disk monitoring) and Hard Disk Sentinel Professional (paid version with alerts, detailed reports, tests). Since 2009, with version 3.00, Hard Disk Sentinel supports numerous RAID controllers, by detection of hard disk status in RAID configurations and disk surface testing.

Since 2012, with version 4.00, Hard Disk Sentinel Pro Portable version is available, working without installation.

In 2017, Version 5.00 released with Disk Repair functionality and Network Attached Storage (NAS) monitoring, export status in XML and WMI. This allows creating third-party applications/add-ons to work together with Hard Disk Sentinel—integration with NagiOS, for example.

The software is designed to find, test, diagnose and repair hard disk drives, reveal problems, display health and avoid failures by using S.M.A.R.T. (Self-Monitoring, Analysis and Reporting Technology) function of hard disk drives. The detected information can be saved to file in formats such as HTML, text, or XML.

Hard Disk Sentinel has the capability to function for both internal hard disks and external hard disks as well as hybrid disk drives (SSHD), SSDs, NAS and RAID arrays within the same software.

DOS version 
In 2008 Hard Disk Sentinel DOS version released in different formats on bootable pendrive, CD, floppy. Usable when no operating system installed (or if the system is not bootable otherwise) to detect and display temperature, health status of IDE, SATA hard disk drives and with limited AHCI controller support. The DOS version has no graphical user interface or disk testing functions and does not support RAID configurations.

Linux version 
In 2008, Hard Disk Sentinel Linux version released, a command-line console tool detection and showing disk status with limited support of RAID configuration and SSDs in addition to hard disk status detection. The Linux version is available on x86, x64 and Raspberry PI, ARMv5 platforms.

Since 30 August 2017, the Linux version supports industrial SD cards too and can be used with NAS devices. The Linux version has no graphical user interface, although extensions created to simplify usage under Linux.

See also 

 Comparison of S.M.A.R.T. tools
 Data scrubbing
 Disk utility
 List of disk partitioning software
 Predictive failure analysis
 System monitor

References

External links
Official website

Hard disk software
Companies established in 2005